Self-Portrait with Model at Bergamo is a bronze sculpture by Giacomo Manzù, originally modeled in 1942.  One cast, made by 1960, is located at the Hirshhorn Museum and Sculpture Garden of the Smithsonian Institution in Washington D.C..

See also
 List of public art in Washington, D.C., Ward 2
 Young Girl on a Chair, another sculpture by Manzù at the Hirshhorn Museum and Sculpture Garden

References

External links
Waymarking

1960 sculptures
Bronze sculptures in Washington, D.C.
Hirshhorn Museum and Sculpture Garden
Sculptures of the Smithsonian Institution
Outdoor sculptures in Washington, D.C.
Self-portraits